Julie Forsyth is an Australian actress best known for her stage performances, and probably Lotis, the talking lift from Lift Off.

In the 1980s and 1990s she was associated with director Jean Pierre Mignon at the Anthill theatre company in Melbourne. Her solo performance as a schoolboy in Kids' Stuff for Anthill, first performed in 1984, toured Australia and festivals in Europe and Singapore.

Her more recent work at Belvoir, Melbourne Theatre Company, Malthouse Theatre and other major Australian theatre companies has included roles in Patrick White's The Ham Funeral and Night on Bald Mountain, Eugène Ionesco's Exit the King, the stage adaptation of Tim Winton's Cloudstreet, and Samuel Beckett's Happy Days and Endgame.

In 2010, she appeared in Dead Gorgeous in the main role as Haiwyn Sinclaire, a.k.a. Miss Sinclair.

In 2013 she appeared in an episode of Miss Fisher's Murder Mysteries (S2:E2), "Death Comes Knocking".

She has received multiple awards including the Sidney Myer Performing Arts Award and Helpmann Awards as both leading and supporting female actor in a play.

References

External links
 

Living people
Australian television actresses
Australian stage actresses
Helpmann Award winners
Year of birth missing (living people)